William D. "Bill" Dyke (April 25, 1930March 10, 2016) was an American lawyer, judge, and politician. He was a two-term mayor of Madison, Wisconsin from 1969 to 1973 and ran for Vice President of the United States on the American Independent Party ticket with presidential candidate Lester Maddox in 1976.  From 1996 until two months before his death, in 2016, he served as a Wisconsin Circuit Court Judge in Iowa County, Wisconsin, he was Chief Judge of the 7th Judicial Administrative District from 2007 to 2013.

Early life
Dyke received his bachelor's degree from DePauw University in Indiana. While completing his degree at the University of Wisconsin Law School, he hosted Circus 3, a local children's television program on WISC-TV. He also moderated Face the State, a local political news program modeled after the nationally televised Face the Nation. The program included interviews with Richard Nixon, Hubert Humphrey, Gerald Ford, John F. Kennedy and other prominent politicians.

Political career
Dyke was a two-term mayor of Madison, Wisconsin from 1969 to 1973. His tenure as mayor is considered a colorful and often controversial part of Madison's history. Dyke presided over Madison during the most turbulent era in the city's history, highlighted by the Sterling Hall bombing and subsequent clashes with student uprisings. One of those student activists, Paul Soglin, defeated Dyke's attempt for re-election in 1973. Undeterred, Dyke ran as the Republican nominee for governor in 1974, losing to Democrat Patrick Lucey.

A conservative Republican, Dyke briefly left the party in 1976 to join Lester Maddox's American Independent Party presidential ticket as the vice presidential nominee; however, he disavowed Maddox's segregationist views. Maddox and Dyke won 170,274 votes in the general election (or 0.21% of votes).

Post-political career
Following the end of his political career, Dyke opened a general contracting business in Mount Horeb, Wisconsin, and bred horses. He also worked as a family mediation lawyer in Mineral Point, Wisconsin.

On December 3, 1996, Governor Tommy Thompson appointed Dyke to the circuit court vacancy in Iowa County, created by the impending retirement of Judge James P. Fiedler. He was elected to a full term on the court in 1998 and subsequently re-elected in 2004 and 2010.  He later was selected as the chief judge of the 7th Judicial Administrative District by the Wisconsin Supreme Court, and served the maximum of three two-year terms in that role.  Dyke left the bench in January 2016, and died of pancreatic cancer in a Dodgeville, WI nursing home two months later.

Dyke illustrated the children's book The General's Hat, or Why the Bell Tower Stopped Working, a tale written by Kay Price about two mice who get on the same ship with General Ulysses S. Grant on his travels to Galena, Illinois.

Electoral history

Madison Mayor (1969, 1971, 1973)

| colspan="6" style="text-align:center;background-color: #e9e9e9;"| Primary Election, March 6, 1973

| colspan="6" style="text-align:center;background-color: #e9e9e9;"| General Election, April 3, 1973

Wisconsin Governor (1974)

| colspan="6" style="text-align:center;background-color: #e9e9e9;"| General Election, November 3, 1974

References

1930 births
2016 deaths
20th-century American politicians
20th-century far-right politicians in the United States
American Independent Party vice presidential nominees
DePauw University alumni
Mayors of Madison, Wisconsin
People from Princeton, Illinois
Artists from Illinois
Artists from Wisconsin
1976 United States vice-presidential candidates
University of Wisconsin Law School alumni
Wisconsin Independents
Wisconsin Republicans
Wisconsin state court judges
People from Mount Horeb, Wisconsin
Deaths from pancreatic cancer
Deaths from cancer in Wisconsin
20th-century American judges